In common parlance, the wives of Henry VIII were the six queen consorts of King Henry VIII of England between 1509 and his death in 1547. In legal terms, Henry had only three wives, because three of his marriages were annulled by the Church of England. However, he was never granted an annulment by the Pope, as he desired, for Catherine of Aragon, his first wife. Annulments declare that a true marriage never took place, unlike a divorce, in which a married couple end their union. Along with his six wives, Henry took several mistresses.

Overview

The six women who were married to Henry VIII, in chronological order:

Henry's first marriage to Catherine of Aragon, lasted nearly 24 years, while the following five lasted less than 10 years combined.

English historian and House of Tudor expert David Starkey describes Henry VIII as a husband:What is extraordinary is that in the beginning of Henry's marriages, he was usually a very good husband. He was very tender to them, research shows that he addressed some of his wives as "sweetheart." He was a good lover, he was very generous: the wives were given huge settlements of land and jewels. He was immensely considerate when they were pregnant. However, if his current wife did not please him or did anything to fire his short temper, there would be consequences. Two of Henry's wives were beheaded by his command.

Scholastic study techniques
A mnemonic device to remember the names of Henry's consorts is "Arrogant Boys Seem Clever, Howard Particularly," indicating their "last names," as known to popular culture: Catherine of Aragon, Anne Boleyn, Jane Seymour, Anne of Cleves, Catherine Howard, Catherine Parr.

A famous rhyme for their fates:

Per The Faber Book of Useful Verse, a variant lyric dated  is "Bluff Henry the Eighth to six spouses was wedded, One died, one survived, two divorced, two beheaded."

One historian created a similar device for remembering Henry VIII's six Thomases (Wolsey, More, Cromwell, Howard, Wriothesley, and Cranmer): "Died, beheaded, beheaded, Self-slaughtered, burned, survived."

Technicalities
 
The epigram divorced, beheaded, died, divorced, beheaded, survived is widely known to Anglophone students of world history but there are a few historical footnotes to keep in mind.

As far as the fates of the wives, technically, the poem should be "Annulled, annulled, died; annulled, beheaded, survived" as Henry VIII's marriage to Anne Boleyn was annulled before her beheading, as well as Catherine of Aragon and Anne of Cleves' marriages being annulled (religious)  instead of divorced (civic). The basis of the Catherine of Aragon annulment was a retcon of the previous narrative of her transition from Arthur to Henry; the basis of the Anne of Cleves annulment was non-consummation.

It is also noted that while Catherine Parr outlived Henry, Anne of Cleves also survived him and was the last of his queens to die.

Descendants and relationships
Catherine of Aragon, Anne Boleyn, and Jane Seymour each gave Henry VIII one child who survived infancy: two daughters and one son. All three of these children eventually ascended to the throne as King Edward VI, Queen Mary I, and Queen Elizabeth I.

Catherine Howard and Anne Boleyn were first cousins and were both beheaded due to accusations of infidelity.  Jane Seymour was second cousin to both Anne Boleyn and Catherine Howard. Several of Henry's wives worked in service to another wife, typically as a lady-in-waiting: Anne Boleyn served Catherine of Aragon, Jane Seymour served both Catherine of Aragon and Anne Boleyn, and Catherine Howard served Anne of Cleves.

Catherine of Aragon

Catherine of Aragon (16 December 14857 January 1536) was Henry's first wife.  In modern sources, her name is most commonly spelled Catherine, although she spelled and signed her name with a "K," which was an accepted spelling in England at the time.

Catherine was originally married to Arthur, Henry's older brother. Catherine was a year older than Arthur and six years older than Henry. After Arthur died in 1502, a papal dispensation was obtained to enable her to marry Henry, though the marriage did not occur until he came to the throne in 1509, when Henry was 18 years old and Catherine was 24. Catherine became pregnant in 1510, but the girl was stillborn. She became pregnant again in 1511 and gave birth to Henry, Duke of Cornwall, who died almost two months later. She gave birth to a stillborn boy in 1513, and to another boy who died within hours in 1515. Finally, at age 31, she bore a healthy daughter, Mary, in 1516. After giving birth to Mary, Catherine is quoted to say, "We are both young. If it was a daughter this time, by the Grace of God the sons will follow". Unfortunately, she never did have that son Henry so desperately wanted. It was two years before she conceived again; the pregnancy ended with a short-lived girl.

It is said that Henry truly loved Catherine of Aragon, as he professed it many times. However, Henry became concerned he did not have a son to continue the Tudor dynasty.

Henry had affairs with several mistresses throughout this marriage, including with Mary Boleyn – the daughter of Thomas Boleyn, English Ambassador to France. Later, Henry turned his attention to her younger sister, Anne Boleyn, appointing her as lady-in-waiting to Catherine. Unlike her sister, Anne refused to become his mistress. Henry wrote many love letters to Anne. By the late 1520s, it was clear Catherine (now in her mid-40s) would not bear any more children, and Henry, increasingly desperate for a legitimate son, planned to marry Anne.

Henry, at the time a Roman Catholic, sought the Pope's approval for an annulment on the grounds that Catherine had first been his brother's wife. He used a passage from the Old Testament (Leviticus Chapter 20 Verse 21): "If a man shall take his brother’s wife, it is an impurity; he hath uncovered his brother’s nakedness; they shall be childless." Despite the Pope's refusal to annul the marriage, Henry separated from Catherine in 1531; Catherine was 46, Henry was 40. He ordered the highest church official in England, Thomas Cranmer, Archbishop of Canterbury, to convene a court. On 23 May 1533, Cranmer ruled the marriage to Catherine null and void. On 28 May 1533, he pronounced the King legally married to Anne (with whom Henry had already secretly exchanged wedding vows). This led to England breaking from the Roman Catholic Church and the establishment of the Church of England.

Shortly after marrying Anne Boleyn, Henry sent Catherine away. She did not see Henry, or their daughter Mary, again before her death in isolation at age 51.

William Shakespeare, in the play Henry VIII, called Catherine "The queen of earthly queens" (2.4.138).

Anne Boleyn

Anne Boleyn (c. 150719 May 1536) was Henry's second wife and the mother of Elizabeth I. Henry's marriage to Anne and her execution made her a key figure in the political and religious upheaval at the start of the English Reformation. She was the daughter of Sir Thomas Boleyn and Lady Elizabeth Boleyn (born Lady Elizabeth Howard), and she was of nobler birth than Jane Seymour, Henry's later wife. She was dark-haired with beautiful features and lively manners; she was educated in Europe. She studied French and lived there for part of her life. She was largely as a lady-in-waiting to Queen Claude of France.

Anne resisted the king's attempts of letters to seduce her and refused to become his mistress as her sister Mary Boleyn had been. It soon became the one absorbing object of the King's desires to secure a divorce from his wife Catherine of Aragon so that he could marry Anne. He wrote a love letter that provides evidence of some level of intimacy between them, in which he admires her "pretty duckies" (breasts). It eventually became clear that Pope Clement VII was unlikely to give the king an annulment, so Henry began to break the power of the Catholic Church in England for the current obsession he had with Anne Boleyn.

Henry dismissed Thomas Wolsey from public office and later had the Boleyn family's chaplain Thomas Cranmer appointed Archbishop of Canterbury. In 1533, Henry and Anne went through a secret wedding service. Henry was 42, and Anne was in her late 20s. She soon became pregnant and there was a second, public wedding service in London on 25 January 1533. On 23 May 1533, Cranmer declared the marriage of Henry and Catherine null and void. Five days later, Cranmer declared the marriage of Henry and Anne to be good and valid. Soon after, the Pope launched sentences of ex-communication against the King and the Archbishop. As a result of Anne's marriage to the King, the Church of England was forced to break with Rome and was brought under the king's control. Anne was crowned Queen Consort of England on 1 June 1533, and she gave birth to Henry's second daughter Elizabeth on 7 September. She failed to produce a male heir, her only son being stillborn. Henry grew tired of Anne and waiting for a son that she could not produce. Henry had their marriage annulled. Henry looked around for another mistress while Thomas Cromwell devised a plot to execute her.

Despite unconvincing evidence, she was found guilty of engaging in relations with her brother, George Boleyn, and Anne, no older than 31 years old, was beheaded on 19 May 1536 for adultery, incest, and high treason. After the coronation of her daughter, Elizabeth I, Anne was venerated as a martyr and heroine of the English Reformation, particularly due to the works of John Foxe. Over the centuries, she has inspired or been mentioned in numerous artistic and cultural works.

Jane Seymour

Jane Seymour (24 October 1537) was Henry's third wife. She served Catherine of Aragon as maid-of-honour and was one of Anne Boleyn's ladies-in-waiting.

Jane, the daughter of Sir John Seymour, a knight, and Margery Wentworth, was most likely born at Wulfhall, Wiltshire, although West Bower Manor in Somerset has also been suggested. Her birth date is not recorded although rumored.  She was of lower birth than most of Henry's wives, only being able to read and write a little, but was much better at needlework and household management, which were considered much more necessary for the time.

Jane married Henry VIII on 20 May 1536, at the Palace of Whitehall, Whitehall, London, the day after Anne Boleyn's execution. Jane was 28, Henry was 45. Almost a year and a half after marriage, Jane gave birth to a male heir, Edward, but she died twelve days later from postpartum complications. Jane was the only wife to receive a proper queen's burial. When Henry died, he chose to be buried next to her in St George's Chapel, Windsor Castle. It is unclear if this decision was purely sentimental or a political signal designed to reinforce the legitimacy of his youthful heir, Edward VI.

Anne of Cleves

Anne of Cleves (28 June or 22 September 151516 July 1557) was a German princess, Henry's fourth wife and queen consort of England, although not crowned, for just six months in 1540, from 6 January to 12 July.  Henry may have referred to her as "A Flanders mare", and the label has stuck.

Anne of Cleves' portrait was painted by Hans Holbein and sent to King Henry to evaluate to be his future wife. Her brother didn't allow Holbein to paint whilst looking directly at Anne and her little sister's faces so they had to wear veils whilst being painted. Henry fell in love with her portrait and wanted her sent to him. When she arrived, Henry was not impressed. Henry complained of her not looking like her portrait. Her pre-contract of marriage with Francis I, Duke of Lorraine, was cited as grounds for annulment, even though their marriage did not proceed. Anne did not resist the annulment, claiming the marriage had not been consummated and was rewarded with a generous settlement including Hever Castle, the former home of the Boleyns, Henry's former in-laws. She was given the name "The King's Sister" and was a lifelong friend to him and his children; Anne of Cleves was approximately the same age as Henry VIII's eldest surviving daughter, Mary. She outlived the King and all his wives, dying at Chelsea Old Manor on 16 July 1557; the most likely cause of her death was cancer. She was buried in Westminster Abbey on 3 August.

Catherine Howard

Catherine Howard (c. 152113 February 1542), also spelled Katheryn, was Henry's fifth wife, between 1540 and 1542. She was the daughter of Lord Edmund Howard and Joyce Culpeper, cousin to Anne Boleyn (the second wife of Henry VIII), second cousin to Jane Seymour (the third wife of Henry VIII), and niece to Thomas Howard, 3rd Duke of Norfolk. She was raised in the household of her step-grandmother Agnes Tilney, the Dowager Duchess of Norfolk. Her uncle Thomas Howard was a prominent politician at Henry's court, and he secured her a place in the household of Henry's fourth wife, Anne of Cleves, where Catherine caught the King's interest. She married him on 28 July 1540 at Oatlands Palace in Surrey, just 19 days after the annulment of his marriage to Anne. He was 49, and she was still a teenager, likely around 18. (Catherine Howard was younger than Henry VIII's oldest child, Mary I, who was 24 years old when he married his fifth wife; Elizabeth was 9, and Edward was 3.)

On 1 November 1541, Henry was informed of her alleged adultery with Thomas Culpeper, her distant cousin; Henry Mannox, who had given her private music lessons while she lived with her step-grandmother; and Francis Dereham, a previous boyfriend from her teenage years. Catherine was stripped of her title as queen in November 1541 and was beheaded in February 1542 on the grounds of treason for committing adultery.

Catherine Parr

Catherine Parr (15125 September 1548), also spelled Kateryn, was the sixth and last wife of Henry VIII, 1543–1547. She was the daughter of Sir Thomas Parr of Kendal and his wife, Maud Green. Through her father, Catherine was a descendant of John of Gaunt, son of King Edward III. Through John of Gaunt's daughter Joan Beaufort, Countess of Westmoreland (Henry's great-great-grandmother), she was Henry's third cousin, once removed. By Henry's paternal descent from another of John of Gaunt's children, John Beaufort, 1st Earl of Somerset, the two were also fourth cousins once removed.

Catherine showed herself to be the restorer of Henry's court as a family home for his children. She was determined to present the royal household as a close-knit one to demonstrate strength through unity to Henry's opposition. Perhaps Catherine's most significant achievement was Henry's passing of an act that confirmed both Mary's and Elizabeth's line in succession for the throne, despite the fact that they had both been made illegitimate by divorce or remarriage. At the time of the passage of the act, Catherine Parr was 31, Mary was 27, Elizabeth was 10, and Henry was 52. Such was Henry's trust in Catherine that he chose her to rule as Regent while he was attending to the war in France, and in the unlikely event of the loss of his life, she was to serve as Regent until nine-year-old Edward came of age.

Catherine also has a special place in history, as she was the most married queen of England, having had four husbands in all; Henry was her third. She had been widowed twice before marrying Henry. After Henry's death, she married Thomas Seymour, uncle of Edward VI of England, to whom she had formed an attachment before her marriage with Henry. She had one child by Seymour, Mary, and died shortly after childbirth, at age 35 or 36. Lady Mary's history is unknown, but she is not believed to have survived childhood. She is buried at Sudeley Castle in the town of Winchcombe.

Ancestry

Armorial bearings

In popular culture

Theatrical adaptations
Six is a pop-rock musical featuring each of Henry's wives. A major theme of the show is that women should be the ones to tell their stories and how much more there is to their stories than how their relationships with Henry ended. The musical was written by Toby Marlow and Lucy Moss. It originated in Edinburgh in 2017, moving to the West End in January 2019. In May 2019, Six had its North American premier at the Chicago Shakespeare Theater. and moved to Broadway in March 2020. The tag line of the show, "Divorced. Beheaded. LIVE in concert!", alludes to the rhyme describing the queens' fates.

TV references 
Season 1 Episode 2 of the BBC One TV series Horrible Histories included a "Divorced, Beheaded and Died" song and talk-show-style comedy skit starring Henry VIII.
https://www.pbs.org/show/secrets-six-wives/

In music
Rick Wakeman's solo album The Six Wives of Henry VIII was conceptually inspired by the six wives. The album features six songs, each named after Henry VIII's wife. The order of songs does not match the chronological order of the marriages.

The 1910 music hall song "I'm Henry VIII, I Am" was about a woman who had 8 husbands, all named Henry.

References

Bibliography
 
 
 
 
 
 
 
 
 

6 Wives of Henry VIII
wives of Henry VIII
 
Lists of wives
wives of Henry VIII
wives of Henry VIII
wives of Henry VIII
Henry VIII